The year 1904 in film involved some significant events.



Events
 As shown in the film series Westinghouse Works, some filmmakers begin to move away from eye-level filmmaking and use the camera to explore spaces from an angle usually inaccessible to the average person.
 William Fox purchases his first Nickelodeon.
 23 June: Marcus Loew founds the theatre chain, the People's Vaudeville Company, which later was renamed Loews Theatres which was the oldest theatre chain operating in North America when it was merged with AMC Theatres in 2006

Films released in 1904

A
 Audley Range School, Blackburn, produced by Mitchell and Kenyon – (GB)
 Automobile Race for the Vanderbilt Cup, directed by Billy Bitzer and A.E. Weed – (US)

B
 The Bewitched Traveller, directed by Lewin Fitzhamon and Cecil Hepworth – (GB)
 Blackpool Victoria Pier, produced by Mitchell and Kenyon – (GB)
 The Bold Bank Robbery, directed by Jack Frawley – (US)
 Buy Your Own Cherries, directed by Robert W. Paul – (GB)

C
 The Cook in Trouble (Sorcellerie culinaire), directed by Georges Méliès – (France)

D
 A Day in the Hayfields, directed by Cecil Hepworth – (GB)

E
 An Englishman Trip to Paris from London, directed by Lewin Fitzhamon – (GB)
 The European Rest Cure, directed by Edwin S. Porter – (US)

F
 Faust and Marguerite (Damnation du docteur Faust), directed by Georges Méliès, based on the 1859 opera by Charles Gounod – (France)
 A Fire in a Burlesque Theatre, directed by A.E. Weed – (US)

G
 Girls Taking Time Checks, directed by Billy Bitzer – (US)

I
 The Impossible Voyage (Le Voyage à travers l'impossible), directed by Georges Méliès, based on the 1882 stage play Journey Through the Impossible by Jules Verne – (France)

L
 The Lost Child, directed by Wallace McCutcheon Sr. – (US)

M
 A Miracle Under the Inquisition (Un miracle sous l'inquisition), directed by Georges Méliès – (France)
 The Mistletoe Bough, directed by Percy Stow – (GB)
 The Moonshiner, directed by Wallace McCutcheon Sr. – (US)

O
 Opening of Drill Hall, Accrington by General Baden-Powell, produced by Mitchell and Kenyon – (GB)

P
 Princess Rajah Dance, directed by A.E. Weed – (US)

R
 A Railway Tragedy, produced by the Gaumont-British Picture Corporation – (GB)

S
 The Strike (La Grève), directed by Ferdinand Zecca – (France)
 The Suburbanite, directed by Wallace McCutcheon Sr. – (US)

T
 Tchin-Chao, the Chinese Conjurer (Le Thaumaturge chinois), directed by Georges Méliès – (France)
 Troubles of a Manager of a Burlesque Show, directed by Wallace McCutcheon Sr. – (US)

W
 Westinghouse Works, 1904, a collection of 21 short films directed by Billy Bitzer – (US)
 The Widow and the Only Man, directed by Wallace McCutcheon Sr. – (US)
 The Wonderful Living Fan (Le Merveilleux Éventail vivant), directed by Georges Méliès – (France)

Births

Deaths
 May 8 – Eadweard Muybridge, cinematographer (born 1830)
 July 15 – Anton Chekhov, writer (born 1860)
 September 22 – Wilson Barrett, actor, writer (born 1846)

References 

 
Film by year